This is a list of Members of Parliament (MPs) elected to the House of Representatives at the 1994 Nepalese legislative election and subsequent by-elections.

The list is arranged by constituency. Ram Chandra Paudel served as the Speaker. There were five prime ministers before the parliament was dissolved in 1999. Man Mohan Adhikari, Sher Bahadur Deuba, Lokendra Bahadur Chand, Surya Bahadur Thapa and Girija Prasad Koirala served as prime ministers in different periods during the term of the parliament.

House of Representatives composition

Leaders 
 Speaker of the House of Representatives:
 Rt. Hon. Ram Chandra Paudel (Nepali Congress)
 Deputy Speaker of the House of Representatives:
 Hon. Ram Vilas Yadav (Rastriya Prajatantra Party) (until 1996)
 Hon. Lila Shrestha Subba (CPN (Unified Marxist–Leninist)) (from 1996)
 Prime Minister of Nepal:
 Hon. Man Mohan Adhikari (CPN (Unified Marxist–Leninist)) (until 12 September 1995)
 Hon. Sher Bahadur Deuba (Nepali Congress) (12 September 1995 – 12 March 1997)
 Hon. Lokendra Bahadur Chand (Rastriya Prajatantra Party) (12 March 1997 – 7 October 1997)
 Hon. Surya Bahadur Thapa (Rastriya Prajatantra Party) (7 October 1997 –15 April 1998)
 Hon. Girija Prasad Koirala (Nepali Congress) (15 April 1998 – 31 May 1999)
 Leader of the Opposition:
 Hon. Sher Bahadur Deuba (Nepali Congress)
 Hon. Girija Prasad Koirala (Nepali Congress)
 Hon. Man Mohan Adhikari (CPN (Unified Marxist–Leninist))
 Hon. Girija Prasad Koirala (Nepali Congress)
 Hon. Bam Dev Gautam (CPN (Marxist–Leninist))

Parliamentary party leaders 
 Parliamentary party leader of Nepali Congress: 
 Hon. Sher Bahadur Deuba
 Hon. Girija Prasad Koirala
 Parliamentary party leader of CPN (Unified Marxist–Leninist): Hon. Man Mohan Adhikari
 Parliamentary party leader of CPN (Marxist–Leninist): Hon. Bam Dev Gautam
 Parliamentary party leader of Rastriya Prajatantra Party: Hon. Surya Bahadur Thapa
 Parliamentary party leader of Rastriya Prajatantra Party (Chand): Hon. Lokendra Bahadur Chand

Whips 

 Chief Whip of Nepali Congress
 Hon. Chiranjibi Wagle
 Hon. Anandra Prasad Dhungana
 Hon. Shiva Raj Joshi
 Whip of Nepali Congress
 Hon. Padma Narayan Chaudhary
 Hon. Gangadhar Lamsal
 Hon. Devendra Raj Kandel

 Chief Whip of CPN (Unified Marxist–Leninist)
 Hon. Devi Prasad Ojha
 Hon. Rajendra Prasad Pandey
 Whip of CPN (Unified Marxist–Leninist)
 Hon. Rajendra Prasad Pandey
 Hon. Khagaraj Adhikari

 Chief Whip of CPN (Marxist–Leninist)
 Hon. Tanka Rai
 Whip of CPN (Marxist–Leninist)
 Hon. Ganga Prasad Chaudhary

List of MPs elected in the election

By-elections

Defections

References

External links 
संसदीय विवरण पुस्तिका, प्रतिनिधि सभा (२०५१ - २०५५) (Parliament Report Booklet, House of Representatives (1994 - 1999)) (in Nepali)
Election Commission of Nepal

General election 1994
General election
1994-related lists
General election 1994